Darevskia valentini, also known commonly as the Caucasian rock lizard or Valentin's lizard,  is a species of lizard in the family Lacertidae. The species is native to southeastern Europe and western Asia. There are three recognized subspecies.

Etymology
The specific name, valentini, is in honor of naturalist Jean Valentin (1868–1898), who was associated with the Senckenberg Naturmuseum.

Geographic range
D. valentini is found in Armenia, Georgia, Iran, and Turkey.

Habitat

Reproduction
D. valentini is oviparous.

Subspecies
Three subspecies are recognized as being valid, including the nominotypical subspecies.
Darevskia valentini lantzicyreni 
Darevskia valentini spitzenbergerae 
Darevskia valentini valentini 

Nota bene: A trinomial authority in parentheses indicates that the subspecies was originally described in a genus other than Darevskia.

References

Further reading
Arnold EN, Arribas O, Carranza S (2007). "Systematics of the Palaearctic and Oriental lizard tribe Lacertini (Squamata: Lacertidae: Lacertinae), with Descriptions of eight new genera". Zootaxa 1430: 1–86. (Darevskia valentini, p. 41).
Boettger O (1892). "Kriechthiere der Kaukasusländer, gesammelt durch die Radde-Valentin'sche Expedition nach dem Karabagh und durch die Herren Dr. J. Valentin und P. Reibisch ". Bericht über die Senckenbergische Naturforschende Gesellschaft in Frankfurt am Main 1892: 131–150. (Lacerta muralis var. valentini, new variety, pp. 145–146). (in German and Latin).
Darevsky IS, Eiselt J (1967). "Ein neuer Name für Lacerta saxicola mehelyi Lantz & Cyrén 1936 ". Annalen des Naturhistorischen Museums in Wien 70: 107. ("Lacerta saxicola lantzicyreni nom. nov.", replacement name). (in German).
Eiselt J, Darevsky IS, Schmidtler JF (1992). "Untersuchungen an Felseidechsen (Lacerta saxicola - Komplex; Reptilia: Lacertidae) in der östlichen Turkei. 1. Lacerta valentini Boettger ". Annalen des Naturhistorischen Museums in Wien, Serie B 93: 1–18. (Lacerta valentini spitzbergerae, new subspecies, p. 13). (in German).
Petrosyan VG, Osipov FA, Bobrov VV, Dergunova NN, Danielyan FD, Arakelyan MS (2019). "New records of Darevskia armeniaca (Méhely, 1909) and Darevskia valentini (Boettger, 1892) (Squamata, Sauria, Lacertidae) from Armenia and updated geographic distribution maps". Check List 15 (1): 21–31. 

Darevskia   
Reptiles described in 1892
Taxa named by Oskar Boettger